"Sur ma vie" (lit. "On My Life") is a song written by Armenian-French artist Charles Aznavour. In April 1956 it became Aznavour's first no. 1 hit in France.

History
It was released as a single by Ducretet-Thomson in 1955. It starts with the words: "On my life I swore to love you 'til my dying day...".

In 1997, Ginette Reno covered it.

"Sur ma vie" was later translated into Dutch ("Zo lief") by Yvan Brunetti and performed by Doran (album Voor jou, 1998).

See also
 La mamma
 40 chansons d'or

References

Charles Aznavour songs
French songs
Songs written by Charles Aznavour
1955 songs